Ongyun is an island located in the Ayeyarwady Region of Myanmar. It is located 400 km southwest of the national capital, Naypyidaw.

References

Islands of Myanmar